George Henry Bethune (September 19, 1878 – August 11, 1965) was a farmer and political figure in Ontario. He represented Wentworth in the Legislative Assembly of Ontario from 1934 to 1943 as a Liberal member.

He was born in Glanford township, the son of William F. Bethune and Helen Storar, both of Scottish origin, and was educated there. In 1911, Bethune married Annie M. Marshall. He served as reeve for Glanford. He died in Hamilton, Ontario in 1965.

References

External links

1878 births
1965 deaths
Ontario Liberal Party MPPs